Inez Foxx (September 9, 1937 – August 25, 2022) and her elder brother Charlie Foxx (October 23, 1933 – September 18, 1998) were an American rhythm and blues and soul duo from Greensboro, North Carolina.  Inez sang lead vocal, while Charlie sang back-up and played guitar. Casey Kasem, and doubtless many others, mistakenly thought that the two were husband and wife.

Biography
Both children were born in Greensboro to John and Peggy Fox.  According to published information in the North Carolina Birth Index, and the U.S. census, Charlie James Fox was born in 1933 and Inez Rebecca Fox in 1937, though subsequent publicity indicated later birth years for both siblings.  They changed their professional names to Foxx with a double 'x'.

Charlie Foxx began singing with a gospel choir as a child in the early 1950s, and was later joined by his sister Inez. In 1960, Inez traveled to New York City and recorded for Brunswick Records using her then-married name Inez Johnston, but with little success. In early 1963, the pair introduced themselves to Henry 'Juggy' Murray, the owner of Sue Records, and sang him their arrangement of the traditional lullaby "Hush, Little Baby". The song, re-titled "Mockingbird," was released on Sue's subsidiary label Symbol Records in June 1963. The single reached the top 10 on both the US rhythm and blues and pop charts.  It was their most successful record, selling over one million copies, and was awarded a gold disc by the RIAA. It was later covered by artists including Aretha Franklin, James Taylor and Carly Simon, Dusty Springfield, Etta James with Taj Mahal and Toby Keith.

The record company, keen to promote Inez Foxx as a solo singer, issued later recordings under her name alone, despite the presence of two voices on the records. Perhaps because "Mockingbird" was seen as a novelty record, the pair had difficulty following it up, although "Ask Me" and "Hurt by Love" made the lower reaches of the US charts, and "Hurt by Love" also reached the UK singles chart.  In 1966, the pair joined Musicor Records and recorded for its subsidiary label, Dynamo. They returned to the pop charts in 1967 with "(1-2-3-4-5-6-7) Count the Days", and became known for their exciting live performances. They toured extensively in Europe and their music played a key role in the development of the Northern soul movement, in which scene they had the very popular "Tightrope" single.

Inez Foxx married songwriter and producer Luther Dixon in the late 1960s. Together they wrote, and he produced, the Platters' mid-1960s return to hit-making with the single "I Love You 1000 Times". Luther Dixon produced Inez and Charlie's 1967 Dynamo album Come By Here, but the couple later divorced.

Inez also had some success recording on her own, beginning in 1969, but her popularity faded in the 1970s. Charlie was already working as a songwriter and record producer when they finally disbanded their act. Inez continued to record as a solo singer for Volt Records in the 1970s.

Charlie Foxx died from leukemia in 1998, at the age of 64, and was buried in Mobile, Alabama. Inez Foxx died in Los Angeles on August 25, 2022, at the age of 84 (though some sources incorrectly stated her age as 79).

Discography

Chart singles

Albums
 Mockingbird (1964)
 Come By Here (1967)
 Greatest Hits (1968)
 Inez & Charlie Foxx's Swinging Mockin' Band (1968) (instrumental album featuring Inez & Charlie Foxx's backing band)
 Inez Foxx At Memphis (1973) (Inez Foxx solo album)
 Inez & Charlie Foxx (1983)

References

External links
 Inez & Charlie Foxx at Soulful Kinda Music
 
 
  (with links to Inez Foxx and Charlie Foxx)

 

African-American musical groups
American rhythm and blues musical groups
Male–female musical duos
Sibling musical duos
Sue Records artists
RCA Records artists
United Artists Records artists
Musical groups from North Carolina
Northern soul musicians
1963 establishments in North Carolina
1971 disestablishments in North Carolina
Musical groups established in 1963
Musical groups disestablished in 1971
Rhythm and blues duos
American soul musical groups
American musical duos